Kéfera Buchmann de Mattos Johnson Pereira (Brazilian Portuguese: /ˈkɛferɐ ˈbuk(i)mɐ̃/, born January 25, 1993) is a Brazilian actress, singer, TV hostess, influencer, writer and YouTuber. She has been named by Forbes as one of the most promising young women in Brazil.

She became known for her YouTube channel 5inco Minutos, which was the first female lead channel of Brazil to reach one million subscribers.

Biography 
Kéfera was born and raised in Curitiba, where she completed her primary and secondary education in Catholic schools. She was raised in a Catholic family. Buchmann is the daughter of Zeiva (Zeivanez) Buchmann.

She studied theater for five years. Kéfera obtained her actress registration in 2013, earning the highest possible score. Her name, "Kéfera", is of Egyptian origin and means "first morning sunshine". During her high school years, Kéfera was very devoted to St. Anthony (a Catholic Saint). Kéfera is bilingual, being fluent in English in addition to her native language Portuguese. She has also worked as an English teacher.

Personal life 
In 2021, Kéfera came out as bisexual.

Filmography

Film

Web/Internet

Television

Theater

Radio

Books

Music

Awards and nominations

References

External links 
 
 

1993 births
Living people
Actresses from Curitiba
Brazilian people of German descent
Brazilian telenovela actresses
Brazilian film actresses
Brazilian stage actresses
Brazilian Internet celebrities
Brazilian YouTubers
Video bloggers
Women video bloggers
Brazilian feminist writers
21st-century Brazilian women writers
21st-century Brazilian writers
21st-century Brazilian actresses
Brazilian bloggers
Brazilian women bloggers
Brazilian feminists
Feminist musicians
Brazilian bisexual people
LGBT YouTubers
Bisexual actresses
Brazilian LGBT actors
21st-century Brazilian LGBT people
LGBT feminists